Borgo San Giovanni is a comune (municipality) in the Province of Lodi in the Italian region Lombardy, located about  southeast of Milan and about  southwest of Lodi.

Borgo San Giovanni borders the following municipalities: Lodi Vecchio, Salerano sul Lambro, Pieve Fissiraga, Castiraga Vidardo, Sant'Angelo Lodigiano.

References

Cities and towns in Lombardy